Imseong-ri Station is a South Korean railway station on the Honam Line.

Railway stations in South Jeolla Province